Ricardo Amorim is a Brazilian economist. He was described as "Brazil's most influential economist" by Forbes magazine.

Ricardo is the author of the best-seller After the Storm, a former host of Manhattan Connection at Globonews, the only Brazilian among the best world lecturers at Speakers Corner and the winner of the “Most Admired in the Economy, Business and Finance Press”.

Top Voice Influencer of Linkedin in Brazil Since 2016 LinkedIn.

Winner of the iBest Award for best contest of Brazil in 2020 and 2021 on three differents categories: Economy and Business, Linkedin Influencer and Opinion and Citizenship.

Career

Amorim holds a B.A. in economics from the University of São Paulo and conducted graduate work in International Finance and Business at ESSEC Business School in Paris.

He is one of the hosts of the roundtable TV show Manhattan Connection on GloboNews, and is an economics and financial markets columnist at ISTOÉ Magazine.

He was one of the few economists to anticipate Brazil's electricity crisis in 2001, the US real estate and financial crisis in 2008, Emerging Markets’ decoupling from the 2009 global financial crisis and Europe's 2011/2012 sovereign crisis. Following a twenty-year career in financial institutions in the US, Brazil and Europe, he returned to Brazil in 2008 after eight years working in Wall Street. In Brazil, he started Ricam Consultoria, a financial consulting firm that advises on economics, finance, investment and strategy.

Awards and recognition
In 2015, he was included by Forbes in its list of the "100 most influential Brazilians".

References

External links
Ricam Consultoria

Living people
Year of birth missing (living people)
Brazilian economists
Brazilian television presenters
Brazilian journalists
University of São Paulo alumni
ESSEC Business School alumni